The  was an insurrection of the Sengoku period of Japan that occurred in Mutsu Province from 13 March to 4 September 1591. The Kunohe Rebellion was the final battle in Toyotomi Hideyoshi's campaigns during the Sengoku period and completed the unification of Japan.

Kunohe Masazane, a claimant to daimyō of the Nanbu clan, launched a rebellion against his rival Nanbu Nobunao backed by Toyotomi Hideyoshi which spread across Mutsu Province. Toyotomi Hideyoshi and Tokugawa Ieyasu sent a large army into the Tōhoku region in mid-1591 which quickly defeated the rebels and Hideyoshi's army arrived at Kunohe Castle in early September. Masazane was outnumbered and surrendered Kunohe Castle but he and the castle defenders were executed.

Rebellion
Kunohe Castle was held by Kunohe Masazane (1536–1591), from a branch line of the Nanbu clan who had ruled the region since the early Muromachi period. In 1582, after the death of Nanbu Harumasa, the 24th head of the Nanbu, the clan split into several competing factions. In 1590, the Sannohe faction led by Nanbu Nobunao organized a coalition of most of the Nambu clans and pledged allegiance to Toyotomi Hideyoshi at the siege of Odawara. In return, Nobunao was recognized as head of the Nanbu clan, and confirmed as daimyō of his existing holdings in the northern districts of Mutsu Province in the northern Tōhoku region. However, Kunohe Masazane, who felt that he had a stronger claim to the title of clan head, immediately rose up in rebellion against Nobunao and Hideyoshi. 

With a large number of Nanbu samurai in the south serving in Hideyoshi’s forces against the Odawara Hōjō, the rebellion soon spread to many locations by 1591. Hideyoshi and Tokugawa Ieyasu took the rebellion as a personal affront to Hideyoshi's authority and efforts to bring the Sengoku period to a close. By mid-year, they had organized a retaliatory army to retake northern Tōhoku and to restore the area to Nobunao’s control. The army had 60,000 troops and a cast of the most famous generals in the late Sengoku period under Tokugawa Ieyasu, including Toyotomi Hidetsugu, Uesugi Kagekatsu, Maeda Toshiie, Satake Yoshishige, Date Masamune, Mogami Yoshiaki, and Tsugaru Tamenobu. The army quickly suppressed the rebellion in many locations and reached the gates of Kunohe Castle by 2 September 1591.

Attack on Kunohe castle
Command of the attack on the Kunohe Castle itself was assigned to Gamo Ujisato, assisted by Asano Nagamasa. Within Kunohe Castle, Kunohe Masazane had only 5,000 defenders but due to his strong defensive position with three sides of his castle protected by rivers, he rejected initial offers that he surrender.  However, Masazane was so strongly outnumbered that after only four days he agreed to a proposal made by a trusted family priest that the defenders would be pardoned if they surrendered. On 4 September, Masazane’s brother, Kunohe Sanechika (who was with the attacking forces) entered the castle and led out several Nanbu clan members who were willing to surrender, and who had donned white robes and had shaved their heads as a sign of humility. The attackers reneged on their promises, and executed the prisoners, along with Kunohe Masazane himself. The remaining defenders, including women and children, were forced into the second bailey, which was then set on fire. According to contemporary records, the fire burned for three days and three nights and killed all within. With the suppression of the Kunohe Rebellion, Japan was officially reunified under Hideyoshi's authority.

References

External links
Profile of Kunohe Castle

1591 in Japan
Conflicts in 1591
16th-century rebellions
Rebellions in Japan
Kunohe
Kunoe
Nanbu clan